Liam Sue-Tin is a Greece international rugby league footballer.

Playing career
In 2022, Sue-Tin was named in the Greece squad for the 2021 Rugby League World Cup, the first ever Greek Rugby League squad to compete in a World Cup.

References

External links
Greek profile

1992 births
Living people
Australian rugby league players
Australian people of Greek descent
Greece national rugby league team players